West Chang'an Avenue Subdistrict is a subdistrict on the eastern part of Xicheng District, Beijing.

The subdistrict got its name from the Chang'an Avenue. , it had 11 residential communities under its administration, containing a total population of 36,645

History

Administrative Division 
As of 2021, there are 11 communities under the subdistrict:

Landmarks 
 Xidan
 Zhongnanhai
 Great Hall of the People
 National Centre for the Performing Arts
 Cathedral of the Immaculate Conception

See also
List of township-level divisions of Beijing

References

External links 
 Official website (Archived)

Xicheng District
Subdistricts of Beijing